The A4069 is an A road which connects Llandovery with Gwaun-Cae-Gurwen in Wales, UK.

Route
The route begins at the junction with the A474 at the north of Gwaun-Cae-Gurwen, and travels through Lower Brynamman and Brynamman.  The route then crosses over the Black Mountain range of the Brecon Beacons and emerges near Felindre near Llangadog.  It crosses through Llangadog and then continues northeast until the junction with the A40 at Llandovery. 
It reaches a height of 493 m (1,617 ft) above sea level.

Roads in Wales
Scenic routes in the United Kingdom
Transport in Carmarthenshire
Transport in Neath Port Talbot